Hippocampus procerus, the high-crown seahorse, is a synonym of Hippocampus whitei, Bleeker, 1855.

References 

procerus
Fish described in 2001